What Thou Wilt is an album of contemporary classical music composed by John Zorn and released in October 2010 on the Tzadik label. The opening concerto was composed in 1999, while the other two pieces date from 2005 and 2007. The album features many of Zorn's prominent collaborators, including Erik Friedlander, Stephen Drury, and Fred Sherry.

Track list
 CONTES DE FÉES - 13:18
 ∴ (Fay Çe Que Vouldras) - 22:53 
 777 (nothing is true, everything is permitted) - 6:10

Personnel
Ryan McAdams: Conductor
Stephanie Nussbaum: Solo Violin
Stephen Drury: Piano
Erik Friedlander: Cello
Fred Sherry: Cello
Mike Nicolas: Cello

The Tanglewood Music Center Orchestra

Karin Andreasen: First Violin
Leah Arsenault: Flute
Sarah Bass: Viola
Joseph Becker: Percussion
Brent Besner: Clarinet
Zachary Boeding: Oboe
Evan Buttemer: Viola
Rosanna Butterfield: Cello
Shawn Conley: Bass
Allison Cook: Bass
Andrew Cuneo: Bassoon
Michael Dahlberg: Cello
F. Ladrón de Guevara: First Violin
Rui Du: Second Violin
Alexandra Early: First Violin
John Elliott: Tuba
Amy Galluzzo: Second Violin
Chen-Erh Ho: Viola

David Hughes: Piano
Julia Hunter: First Violin
Oya Kazuki: Percussion
Kathryn Kilian: Second Violin
Anna Lindvall: Trombone
Te-Chiang Liu: First Violin
Mary Lynch: Oboe
Joseph Maile: First Violin
Derek Mosloff: Viola
Tim Riley: Horn
Laura Scalzo: Second Violin
Derek Stults: Percussion
Meryl Summers: Bassoon
Charles Tyler: Cello
Tema Watstein: Second Violin
Ryan Yuré: Clarinet
Heather Zinninger: Flute

References

2010 albums
John Zorn albums
Tzadik Records albums
Albums produced by John Zorn